Hari Shankar Tiwari is an Indian politician from Gorakhpur in eastern Uttar Pradesh. A known bahubali leader of 80s and 90s decade. Tiwari was a member of the Uttar Pradesh Legislative Assembly from the village Tanda,In Barhalganj police station,which lies Chillupar assembly in Gorakhpur district. His two sons Bhishma Shankar Tiwari and Vinay Shankar Tiwari are very popular in youths and active in current politics of purvanchal.

Politics
Tiwari was the first gangster in Indian political history to have won elections from prison. Elected from Chillupar, he remained a member of the legislative assembly for years.  Tiwari is known for his brahmin politics.

In 1997, he was founding member of Akhil Bharatiya Loktantrik Congress along with Jagdambika Pal, Rajeev Shukla, Shyam Sunder Sharma and Bacha Pathak.

He has been a cabinet minister at the State Assembly in several governments, including the Kalyan Singh (Bharatiya Janata Party) government (1997–1999). He was also a minister in the Mulayam Singh Yadav (Samajwadi Party) government (2003–2007).

In 2000, he was the Stamp and Registration cabinet minister in Ram Prakash Gupta's government . In 2001, he was the cabinet minister in Rajnath Singh's government and also in year 2002, he was the cabinet minister in Mayawati's Government.

Family
His son Bhishma Shanker Tiwari, was Member of Parliament, Sant Kabir Nagar seat west of Gorakhpur.

Another son, Vinay Shankar Tiwari, stood from Gorakhpur but lost to Yogi Adityanath by a margin of  votes. He also lost a runoff election from Ballia in 2007 by 130,000 votes. He was an MLA from Chillupar from 2018 to 2022.

Nephew Ganesh Shankar Pandey was a state legislator from Maharajganj. In 2010 he won the MLC election for the fourth consecutive time, and was the speaker of the legislative council.

He was succeeded by Rajesh Tripathi. After that Vinay Shankar Tiwari won again from the Chillupar constituency in the 17th Legislative Assembly of Gorakhpur. The latter however lost to Tripathi in the 2022 Uttar Pradesh Legislative Assembly election.

References
 

People from Gorakhpur
Indian National Congress politicians from Uttar Pradesh
Members of the Uttar Pradesh Legislative Assembly
All India Indira Congress (Tiwari) politicians
Akhil Bharatiya Loktantrik Congress politicians
Living people
Indian gangsters
21st-century Indian politicians
Criminals from Uttar Pradesh
Year of birth missing (living people)